Fraser Lyle (born 16 June 1988) is a Scotland 7s international rugby union player. He is a utility back and can play at centre, fly-half, or fullback. He plays for London Scottish. He previously played for Glasgow Warriors.

Rugby union career

Amateur career

Lyle has played rugby for Morrison's Academy, Crieff & Strathearn RFC, Aberdeen Grammar, Calgary Hornets  and Stirling County.

Professional career

Lyle was working as an estate agent before his dream call up to the Glasgow Warriors in November 2014

He was part of the Glasgow Warriors squad that successfully defended their Melrose 7s title in 2015.

Glasgow Warriors extended Lyle's contract through to May 2017.

On 4 May 2017 it was announced that Lyle would be released by the Warriors at the end of the season. He made 8 first team appearances for the club.

For the 2017-18 season Lyle signed for London Scottish.

International career

He was called into the Scotland Sevens for the Hong Kong Sevens tournament in 2015

External links 
 Glasgow Warriors player biography

References 

1988 births
Living people
People educated at Morrison's Academy
Glasgow Warriors players
Scottish rugby union players
Scotland international rugby sevens players
Rugby union wings
Rugby union players from Stirling
Aberdeen University RFC players
London Scottish F.C. players
Male rugby sevens players